The 2022 Bluegreen Vacations Duels were a pair of NASCAR Cup Series stock car races held on February 17, 2022, at Daytona International Speedway in Daytona Beach, Florida. Both contested over 60 laps, they were the qualifying races for the 2022 Daytona 500.

Report

Background

Daytona International Speedway is one of six superspeedways to hold NASCAR races, the others being Michigan International Speedway, Auto Club Speedway, Indianapolis Motor Speedway, Pocono Raceway and Talladega Superspeedway. The track's turns are banked at 31 degrees, while the front stretch, the location of the finish line, is banked at 18 degrees.

Qualifying

Qualifying results

Duels

Duel 1
Mainly uneventful, Kyle Larson led through lap 34, when the Fords took charge after green flag stops, leading the remainder of the event. With inside of five to go, Brad Keselowski took the lead from Ryan Blaney and went on to win. Kaz Grala made a final lap pass on J.J. Yeley to make the Daytona 500.

Duel 1 results

Duel 2
Also somewhat uneventful, Denny Hamlin spun on pit road while trying to make a green-flag pit stop on lap 27. On the final lap, Joey Logano tried to made a block on the inside on Chris Buescher, but spun himself out and collected Harrison Burton. The only caution of either duel was displayed and Chris Buescher took the win over Michael McDowell, with RFK Racing sweeping the duels. Greg Biffle made the Daytona 500 over Timmy Hill.

Duel 2 results

Media

Television

Radio

References

Bluegreen Vacations Duels
Bluegreen Vacations Duels
Bluegreen Vacations Duels
NASCAR races at Daytona International Speedway